Philip Aksel Frigast Zinckernagel (born 16 December 1994) is a Danish professional footballer who plays as a winger for Belgian club Standard Liège, on loan from Olympiacos.

Club career

Early career
In March 2018, Zinckernagel joined Eliteserien side FK Bodø/Glimt from SønderjyskE for €200,000. 

Zinckernagel scored 19 goals as FK Bodø/Glimt won their first ever top-flight Norwegian title in 2020. He also scored three goals in the 2020–21 UEFA Europa League qualifying phase before losing to Milan in the third qualifying round.

England
On 1 January 2021, Zinckernagel signed for English side Watford on a five-and-a-half year contract. He scored his first goal for Watford in a 6–0 win against Bristol City on 13 February 2021.

On 7 August 2021, Zinckernagel signed on a season-long loan with EFL Championship side Nottingham Forest. He scored his first goal for the club in a 2–1 defeat to Blackburn Rovers on 18 August 2021. On 10 June 2022, Forest announced Zinckernagel would be returning to Watford once his loan expired.

Olympiacos
On 24 June 2022, Zinckernagel joined Greek champions Olympiacos on a three-year contract for an undisclosed fee.

Zinckernagel made his debut for Olympiacos in a UEFA Champions League second qualifying round tie against Israeli side Maccabi Haifa on 20 July 2022. He scored as the match finished in a 1–1 draw.

Zinckernagel joined Belgian side Standard Liège on loan on transfer deadline day after a falling out with Olympiacos manager Carlos Corberán. Corberan himself was later dismissed of his duties as Olympiacos manager on 18 September 2022.

Career statistics

Honours
Bodø/Glimt
Eliteserien: 2020

Nottingham Forest
EFL Championship play-offs: 2022

Individual
Eliteserien Player of the Year: 2020

Eliteserien Top assist provider: 2020

References

1994 births
Living people
Danish men's footballers
Footballers from Copenhagen
Association football midfielders
FC Nordsjælland players
HB Køge players
FC Helsingør players
SønderjyskE Fodbold players
FK Bodø/Glimt players
Watford F.C. players
Nottingham Forest F.C. players
Olympiacos F.C. players
Standard Liège players
Danish Superliga players
Eliteserien players
English Football League players
Super League Greece players
Belgian Pro League players
Danish expatriate men's footballers
Expatriate footballers in Norway
Expatriate footballers in England
Expatriate footballers in Greece
Expatriate footballers in Belgium
Danish expatriate sportspeople in Norway
Danish expatriate sportspeople in England
Danish expatriate sportspeople in Greece
Danish expatriate sportspeople in Belgium